Homotopia is a 2007 short film by Eric A. Stanley and Chris E. Vargas. This film is a radical queer critique of the politics of gay marriage and assimilation and addresses issues of racism, colonialism, HIV/AIDS, and the state. Using a gritty shoot-and-run style, the film is also heavily influenced by Born in Flames and The Battle of Algiers.

Homotopia uses a radical queer/feminist critique of the institution of marriage to argue against the logic that "gay marriage" would lead to queer liberation. Yoshi falls in love with someone he meets in a park bathroom while reading Frantz Fanon's Black Skin, White Masks. Sadly, his new love interest is about to get married to another man. Yoshi and his band of radical queers decide to interrupt the wedding.

Homotopia stars San Francisco-based performance/visual artist Jason/Joy Fritz, gender illusionist Susan Withans, Kentaro J. Kaneko who worked with Gay Shame, Ralowe T. Ampu formerly of Deep Dickollective, and author/activist Mattilda Bernstein Sycamore also known as Matt Bernstein Sycamore.

A sequel to Homotopia was created eight years later, titled Criminal Queers. The film is a "prison-break style comedy", meant as a commentary on the American prison system and its oppression of queer folk.

The film has fewer than 50 ratings on Rotten Tomatoes, has a 7.2/10-star rating with 20 reviews on IMDb, and has one 2-star rating on Letterboxd.

See also

Anarcho-queer
Rainbow capitalism
Gay Shame
Bash Back!
LGBT social movements
Queer nationalism
Queercore
Queeruption
Gay Liberation Front

References

External links
 

2007 drama films
2007 LGBT-related films
2007 films
LGBT criticism of marriage
Films about anarchism
2007 short films
American LGBT-related films
LGBT anarchism
Same-sex marriage in film
Queer feminism
2000s English-language films
2000s American films